The 2007 New Zealand gallantry awards were announced via a Special Honours List on 2 July 2007, and recognised four New Zealand military personnel for actions while serving in Afghanistan in 2004. The identities of three of the four award recipients were not released for operational security reasons. Willie Apiata was awarded the Victoria Cross for New Zealand, the first and so far only time the decoration has been awarded since its inception in 1999.

Victoria Cross for New Zealand (VC)
 Corporal Bill Henry Apiata – 1st New Zealand Special Air Service Group

New Zealand Gallantry Decoration (NZGD)
 Captain C – 1st New Zealand Special Air Service Group

 Corporal B – 1st New Zealand Special Air Service Group

New Zealand Gallantry Medal (NZGM)
 Corporal R – 1st New Zealand Special Air Service Group

References

New Zealand Royal Honours System
Gallantry awards
Hon
New Zealand gallantry awards